Cetina can refer to:
 Cetina, river in southern Croatia
 Cetina, Croatia, village in Civljane municipality, Šibenik-Knin County, Croatia
 Cetina, Aragon, municipality in Zaragoza Province, Spain
 Beltrán de Cetina (1525-1600?), Spanish conquistador
 Gutierre de Cetina (1519-1554), Spanish poet and soldier